Eunica is a genus of nymphalid butterflies found in the Neotropical realm.

Species

The genus contains the following species, listed alphabetically:

 Eunica alcmena (Doubleday, [1847])
 Eunica alpais (Godart, [1824])
 Eunica amelia (Cramer, [1777])
 Eunica amycla (Godart, [1824])
 Eunica anna (Cramer, 1780)
 Eunica araucana C. & R. Felder, 1862
 Eunica bechina (Hewitson, 1852)
 Eunica brunnea Salvin, 1869
 Eunica caelina (Godart, [1824])
 Eunica caralis (Hewitson, 1857)
 Eunica carias (Hewitson, 1857)
 Eunica chlorochroa (Salvin, 1869) - Mira purplewing
 Eunica clytia (Hewitson, 1852)
 Eunica concordia (Hewitson, 1852) – sandbar purplewing
 Eunica cuvierii (Godart, [1819]) – Cuvier's purplewing
 Eunica eburnea Fruhstorfer, 1907
 Eunica elegans Salvin, 1869
 Eunica eurota (Cramer, [1775])
 Eunica evelide Bates, 1864
 Eunica incognita Jenkins, 1990
 Eunica ingens Seitz, 1915
 Eunica interphasis Jenkins, 1990
 Eunica heraclites Gundlach, 1881
 Eunica macris (Godart, [1824])
 Eunica maja (Fabricius, 1775)
 Eunica malvina Bates, 1864 – Malvina purplewing
 Eunica margarita (Godart, [1824])
 Eunica marsolia (Godart, [1824])
 Eunica mira Godman & Salvin, 1877
 Eunica monima (Stoll, [1782]) - dingy purplewing
 Eunica mygdonia (Godart, [1824])
 Eunica norica (Hewitson, 1852) – Norica purplewing
 Eunica olympias C. & R. Felder, 1862
 Eunica orphise (Cramer, [1775])
 Eunica phasis C. & R. Felder, 1862
 Eunica pomona (C. & R. Felder, [1867]) – rounded purplewing 
 Eunica pusilla Bates, 1864 - pusilla purplewing
 Eunica sophonisba (Cramer, [1782]) – glorious purplewing
 Eunica sydonia (Godart, [1824]) – Godart's purplewing
 Eunica tatila (Herrich-Schaeffer, [1855]) – Florida purplewing
 Eunica venusia (C. & R. Felder, 1867)
 Eunica veronica Bates, 1864
 Eunica viola Bates, 1864
 Eunica violetta Staudinger, [1885]
 Eunica volumna (Godart, [1824])

References

Jenkins, D. W. 1990. Neotropical Nymphalidae. VIII. Revision of Eunica. Bulletin of the Allyn Museum 131:1-175.
Lamas, G. (ed.) 2004. Atlas of Neotropical Lepidoptera. (Checklist: Part 4A, Hesperioidea to Papilionoidea). Scientific Publishers, Gainesville, Florida.

External links
Eunica, Tree of Life

Biblidinae
Nymphalidae of South America
Nymphalidae genera
Taxa named by Jacob Hübner